Badhl al-Majhud fi Hall Sunan Abi Dawud is a comprehensive and detailed arabic commentary on Sunan Abu Dawood, authored by Khalil Ahmad Saharanpuri. Widely acclaimed as the foremost work of its kind, it is esteemed by Islamic scholars worldwide. Completed over a decade in Medina, this book is an indispensable resource for those seeking to understand the nuances of Sunan Abu Dawood. In addition to providing clarification on Sunan Abu Dawood, Saharanpuri's commentary scrutinizes and analyzes narrations and traditions from other hadith books, making it an invaluable reference work. Saharanpuri's commentary is characterized by impartiality and balance, presenting both sides of controversial issues with clarity and objectivity. The author supports his arguments with evidence, without showing any bias towards either perspective, making it a fair and comprehensive analysis of Sunan Abu Dawood and related traditions.

Initially, Saharanpuri completed the commentary in five volumes, after which he dictated it to his student Zakariyya Kandhlawi due to his advancing age and tremors. Kandhlawi subsequently published a revised edition spanning 20 volumes, which has been hailed as a seminal contribution to Islamic scholarship.

Background 
Saharanpuri had originally intended to undertake this commentary earlier in his life, but his numerous academic and literary engagements had prevented him from doing so. In his later years, he sought the assistance of his student Zakariyya Kandhlawi to help him complete this monumental task. The first volume was completed in 1917, with Saharanpuri dictating the commentary to Kandhlawi due to tremors in his hands. The teacher and student then journeyed to the Hejaz, where they completed the remaining volumes, including the final part in Medina after ten years of hard work. Saharanpuri's work on the art of Hadith is divided into five volumes, totaling 1938 pages, and provides a detailed list of the sources he used in his research. He consulted works such as Ali al-Qari's Sharh Mishkat, Fathul Bari, Umdatul Qari, and Badai Al-Sana'i to study the words and meanings of hadith, and Taqreeb Al-Tehzeeb, Tehzeeb Al-Tehzeeb, Al-Isaba, and Al-Ansab Li-Sam'ani for information about the men of Hadith. For linguistics, he referenced the dictionary Majma' Bahar Al-Anwar and Lisan Al-Arab. The third edition, with annotations by Kandhlawi and his students Rashid and Roshd, was published in volumes from Egypt and India.

Methodology 
In his book, Saharanpuri presents both sides of any debate with impartiality, providing evidence for each viewpoint without expressing a preference. For instance, he notes that the Hanafis believe that the time of Maghrib ends with the disappearance of twilight, which they refer to as the whiteness of the horizon, whereas the Shafis refer to the redness. Saharanpuri presents both opinions without criticism or bias.

Features 
Some features of Badhl Al-Majhud Fi Hall Abi Dawud are:
Most of the topics are derived from the discourses of advanced scholars, but the explanations and clarifications of "Qala Abu Dawud" are the author's own thoughts and reflections because scholars did not pay much attention to this discussion.
A detailed description of every narrator is written when they are first mentioned and later only referred to.
The Hanafi school of thought has been presented in a suitable manner, and the hadiths have been scrutinized. If the hadith is in accordance with their school of thought, then it is accepted, otherwise their sources are mentioned, and the hadith is analyzed in detail.
If a hadith is unclear at a certain place, its clarification is given. The authors of Al-Iaya and Aun al-Ma'bood have been identified wherever there are ambiguities so that readers are saved from misunderstanding.
If the narrations that Imam Abu Dawud has mentioned briefly have been explained in detail somewhere, then they are referenced as "M" in the book.
The opinions of the Mujtahids, especially the Imams of the four schools of thought, are included, referencing the Al-Shawkani method.
The author has collected the narrations that he has written as Mursal or Mualaq and included them in the book.
Most of the work of Badhl Al-Majhud Fi Hall Abi Dawud, guided by the teachings of Rashid Ahmad Gangohi, has been included in the explanation.

Reception 
Yahya Naqshbandi writes about the style of explanation in the book Badhl Al-Majhud Fi Hall Abi Dawud. He notes that during the time this book was written, the scientific taste of the region was generally inclined towards jurisprudence and fundamental topics. However, Badhl Al-Majhud presents discussions in both the style of jurisprudence and hadith, which is a unique feature of Shah Waliullah Dehlawi's work.

See also 
Deobandi hadith studies

References

External links 
  at Internet Archive

Deobandi hadith literature
Hadith commentaries
Islamic literature
Sunni literature
Hanafi literature
Arabic-language books
20th-century Indian books
Indian non-fiction books
Indian religious texts